Kolekanos is a genus of African gecko found in Angola.It contains two species:

Kolekanos plumicauda 
Kolekanos spinicaudus

References

Kolekanos